Axel Skovgaard was a Danish violinist, who performed throughout the United States and Canada during the first three decades of the 20th century.

European beginnings

Axel Skovgaard was born May 20, 1875, in Copenhagen, Denmark.  He showed promise at an early age and began his musical studies at the age of six. In the years that followed he studied with the famed violinists Carl Halir, Emanuel Wirth and Joseph Joachim.

As a young man Skovgaard performed in much of Scandinavia and Germany and appeared before the rulers of Denmark, Norway, Sweden and Germany.  He was also a member of the Meiningen Court Orchestra and the Copenhagen Philharmonic.

In 1902 he purchased a 1712 Stradivarius violin, which became his constant companion and instrument of choice.

American career
Skovgaard came to America in 1903 when he accepted a position with the New York Symphony Orchestra under the direction of Walter Damrosch. By 1905 he had formed the Skovgaard Concert Company along with pianist Christine Nilsson and vocalist Eleonora Olson. Within a few years both Nilsson and Olson had left the group. Eleonora Olson started her own company in 1909 with which she enjoyed considerable success.

Alice McClung became Skovgaard's new accompanist. McClung, who had been a student of the Swedish pianist August Hyllestad, was a talented soloist and ensemble player. She joined Skovgaard's company in 1908  and eventually became his wife. The couple played together for over thirty years, their partnership lasting until Alice Skovgaard's death in 1946.

From 1905 onwards, Skovgaard traveled the country, often giving concerts under the auspices of the Chautauqua and Lyceum organizations. Their publications are, in fact, the primary source of information on the Danish violin virtuoso.

Axel Skovgaard toured constantly, giving over one thousand performances during one nine-year stretch. His American tours were well-documented in the small town press, and many of these accounts can be read at the Newspaper Archive and similar sites.

The Library of Congress has Skovgaard concert programs, which list several of the works he performed. Although he himself made no recordings, this portion of his repertoire can be heard at video-sharing websites or purchased from digital music download services.

Music played by Axel Skovgaard

Ballade et Polonaise - Vieuxtemps   
The Bee - Schubert
Chant sans paroles - Tchaikovsky
Fantaisie Hongroise - Hubay
Kreutzer Sonata - Beethoven
La Folia - Corelli
Humoresque - Dvořák
Nocturne - Chopin
Scenes de la Csarda - Hubay
Serenade - Schubert
Sicilienne et Rigaudon - Kreisler
Traumerei - Schumann
Violin Concerto in D major - Brahms
Violin Concerto in F sharp minor - Ernst
Violin Concerto in E minor - Mendelssohn
Violin Concerto in A major - Svendsen
Violin Concerto in F sharp minor - Vieuxtemps    
Violin Sonata in E minor - Sjögren
Zapateado - Sarasate

References

External links
 

August Hyllested profile
Historic American Newspapers
Axel Skovgaard advertisements and articles
 Circuit Chautauqua in the Twentieth Century
What was Chautauqua?
A Chautauqua Summer
Axel Skovgaard concert programs at the Library of Congress.
Advertisements
The Skovgaard Concert Party in The Lyceumite and Talent: February 1910, page 45.
Skovgaard in The Lyceumite and Talent: April 1910, page 47.
Articles
"The Story of My Violin" in The Lyceumite and Talent: March 1910, page 54.
"The Danish Ole Bull" in The Lyceumite and Talent: April 1910, page 20.
Skovgaard Concert Company 1905-1907
Skovgaard postcard
Axel Skovgaard photo
Christine Nilsson photo
Eleonora Olson photo
Skovgaard articles and advertisements 
Alice McClung
Alice McClung photo
Alice McClung obituary
McCartney and McClung Families Genealogy
Alice McClung
Axel Skovgaard 
Eleonora Olson Company
Olson Company: concert programs from 1911 to 1917 
"Luk Dot Vindow": humorous story from 1925  
Streaming audio
Music from the repertoire of Axel Skovgaard at the Internet Archive.

1875 births
American classical violinists
Male classical violinists
American male violinists
Chautauqua
Chautauqua Institution
Danish emigrants to the United States
Danish violinists
Lyceum movement
Musicians from Copenhagen
Year of death missing